Jeffrey Alan Cook (August 27, 1949 – November 7, 2022) was an American country music artist. He was best known for being a founding member of the band Alabama, in which he contributed to occasional lead vocals, guitar, fiddle, piano and other musical instruments.

Life and career
Jeffrey Alan Cook was born in Fort Payne, Alabama, and was of English and Native American descent. He was a graduate of Fort Payne High School and Jacksonville State University. He obtained a broadcast engineer license three days after his fourteenth birthday, and worked at a local radio station as a disc jockey while still in high school.

Cook co-founded the band Wildcountry, along with his cousins Randy Owen and Teddy Gentry, in 1972 (the name was changed to Alabama in 1977).  He contributed lead as well as backing vocals, lead guitar, keyboard, and fiddle to the group's productions.  Since the band ceased active production and performance in 2004, Cook has formed the groups Cook & Glenn and the Allstar Goodtime Band, with which he performed.

In addition to his performance work, Cook founded Cook Sound Studios, Inc., in his native Fort Payne, and also established radio station WQRX-AM, which he later sold, in adjacent Valley Head, Alabama.  Cook is also noted for his culinary endeavors, having operated a restaurant and marketed his own sauce.

Cook endorsed the 2008 presidential candidacy of former Arkansas governor Mike Huckabee, and made appearances with the candidate in Alabama.

Cook was inducted into the Musicians Hall of Fame and Museum in 2019.

Personal life and death
Cook toured in 2022 with Alabama for their 50th Anniversary tour. On April 11, 2017, Cook disclosed that he was diagnosed with Parkinson's disease four years earlier. He stopped touring regularly with Alabama in 2018. Cook died from complications of the disease in Destin, Florida, on November 7, 2022, at the age of 73.

Solo discography 
2005: On Fire
2008: Just Pickin'''
2009: Ashes Won't Burn2009: Jeff Cook Presents Christmas Joy2009: "Tribute to a Soldier" (single with Charlie Daniels and Ken Randolph)
2010: Shaken... Not Stirred2011: 2 Rock 4 Country2011: Bits & Pieces / Odds & Ends2012: Shaken Not Stirred2018: Why Not Me'' with William Shatner

References 

https://www.mynewsletterbuilder.com/email/newsletter/1416074853

External links
Jeff Cook and the AGB official website
The Alabama Band official website
 
 

1949 births
2022 deaths
Alabama (American band) members
Alabama Republicans
American country fiddlers
American country singer-songwriters
American people of English descent
American people who self-identify as being of Native American descent
Deaths from Parkinson's disease 
Neurological disease deaths in Florida
People from Fort Payne, Alabama
Country Music Hall of Fame inductees
Members of the Country Music Association
Singer-songwriters from Alabama
Jacksonville State University alumni